Claremont Meadows is a suburb of Sydney, in the state of New South Wales, Australia. Claremont Meadows is located 45 kilometres west of the Sydney central business district, in the local government area of the City of Penrith and is part of the Greater Western Sydney region.

History
Prior to European colonisation of Australia in 1788, the area was occupied by the Aboriginal Darug tribe. However, in 1810 Governor Macquarie granted  of land to Mary Bligh as a wedding present when she married Maurice O'Connell. The property was named Coallee, although the family never resided there. The land was subsequently subdivided, and renamed Claremont by Bryan Molloy. The area was opened for residential housing in 1984 and has grown steadily since.

Commercial area
Claremont Meadows has a small shopping centre, with an IGA supermarket, pharmacy, hairdressers, dental surgery, hot food shop and bakery. It also has a community centre and two preschools. Claremont Meadows Primary School was opened in 1997.

Transport
Claremont Meadows is serviced by buses operated by Busways. The nearest railway station is Werrington. Member for Mulgoa Tanya Davies, Member for Penrith Stuart Ayres and Minister for Urban Infrastructure Paul Fletcher officially opened the Werrington Arterial Road (Gipps Street) on 26 May 2017. The M4 on and off ramps connect Claremont Meadows directly on to the M4 Motorway going east.

Population
According to the 2016 census, there were 4,776 residents in Claremont Meadows. The most common ancestries in Claremont Meadows were Australian 26.2%, English 21.4% and Irish 6.0%. Aboriginal and Torres Strait Islander people made up 2.8% of the population. 72.3% of residents were born in Australia. The next most common countries of birth were Philippines 3.4%, India 3.0% and England 2.5%. 74.3% of people spoke only English at home. Other languages spoken at home included Arabic 2.1% and Tagalog 2.1%. The most common responses for religion in Claremont Meadows were Catholic 34.3%, No Religion 19.3%, Anglican 16.2%, Not Stated 5.6% and Hinduism 3.4%.

References

External links
 Welcome to: Claremont Meadows NSW, Australia
 Claremont Meadows Primary School

Suburbs of Sydney
City of Penrith